Nachrichtentechnische Fachberichte (abbreviated NTF) is a German-language technical journal, published by VDE-Verlag since 1956.  It has been referred to as "obscure".

References

German-language journals